Aangan is a Pakistani family drama television series premiered on 18 November 2017 on ARY Digital and ended on 12 July 2018. It was written by Faiza Iftikhar, directed by Qasim Ali Mureed and created by Humayun Saeed and Shahzad Nasib under Six Sigma Plus. The serial was broadcast on ARY Digital, as a part of night prime time slot programming.

Aangan has an ensemble cast with Mansha Pasha, Qavi Khan, Samina Ahmad, Irsa Ghazal, Mariam Ansari, Hassan Ahmed, Iffat Rahim, Yasra Rizvi, Zainab Qayyum, Waseem Abbas, Paras Masroor, Uzma Hassan and Mariam Mirza in pivot roles. It received three nominations at 18th Lux Style Awards.

Plot 

Aangan is the story of a joint Punjabi family headed by Mian ji who lives with his wife, Zaitoon Bano, his three sons with their families and an unmarried daughter, Zoya. They are worried about Zoya's marriage. Zoya's eldest sister in law, Hajira, invites her friend's son, Aqdus, to come live with them for some time as he lives abroad and is looking for an apartment. He falls in love with Zoya and asks his mom to come and ask for her hand in marriage. Her mom though reluctant (as Zoya is older than Aqdus) asks for her son's marriage with Zoya, which leaves the family shocked as they had expected him to marry Shaina, Hajira's daughter.

Hajira's son, Saadan is in love with Afra but cannot marry her as Hajira is against the marriage and wants Shaina to get married first. The second daughter in law, Laila has no child and often gets taunted for the same, however her husband, Asim loves her dearly. The third daughter in law, Rubeena is pregnant with her fourth child. Her husband, Zahid is a moulvi but he does nothing to support her kids or wife who are being looked after by his brothers. After Zoya marries Aqdus, the family is happy until they find out that Asim has another wife Haseena. Also, Saadan secretly marries Afra with the blessings of Asim, Zahid and his father Sajjad on his side.

Later Safeer, the second son who lives in Germany, returns to Pakistan for his share of property so that he can use that money for his son Waleed's marriage. He tells everyone to sell  the house and the factory and take their shares and live separately. Anila, the first daughter of the family and troublemaker is in favour of Safeer so that Safeer marry his son with one of her daughters. But later, finds out that Safeer had already arranged the marriage of his son with a rich businessman's daughter in Pakistan. The sons and Mian jee decide to sell their house and factory and take their shares. Due to all those tractions, Sajjad the elder son, dies of heart failure.

In the last episode Safeer says he does not want his share and leaves for Germany. A few months later, with everything back to normal, Zahid and Saadan now run the factory and Haseena is now treated equally as Laila. The story ends with a good news that Afra, Saadan's wife is pregnant with a baby girl.

Cast
Qavi khan as Mian Ji
Samina Ahmed as Zaitoon Bano
Mansha Pasha as Zoya; Mian Ji and Zaitoon's younger daughter
Noor ul Hassan as Sajjad; son of Mian Ji
Irsa Ghazal as Hajra Sajjad; Sajjad's wife
Zainab Qayyum as Aneela; Mian Ji's elder daughter
Waseem Abbas as Alauddin; son-in-law of Mian Ji, Aneela's husband
Hassan Ahmed as Asim; second son of Mian Ji
Iffat Umer as Laila: Asim's first wife
Yasra Rizvi as Haseena; Asim's Second wife
Zia Gurchani as Shafiq; third son of Mian Ji
Paras Masroor as Zahid; youngest son of Mian Ji
Uzma Hassan as Rubina; Zahid's wife
Mariam Mirza as Safeeha; Aqdas's mother
Arsalan Faisal as Saadan; Sajjad's son
Mariam Ansari as Afrah; Saadan's fiancée and later wife
Zubii Majeed as Shaheena: Sajjad's daughter
Tauqeer Ahmed as Aqdas
Mutahara Awan as Ramna
Tasneem Ansari as Kulsoom
Sahar Hashmi as Ramsha
Gul-e-Rana as Bilqees Kenchi (cameo appearance)
Fouzia Mushtaq (cameo appearance)

Reception

Critics' views
Aangan has positive reviews from critics on its premier. Sadaf Hiader of Dawn Images lauded the serial by stating, "Angan gives us a fresh look at family life, showing us that dramas don’t have to follow the same dysfunctional tropes and tired old storylines to be entertaining." The Express Tribune said it as "a game changer of 2018" and praised its execution and writing, stating, "The best part about the story is that there is no lead character in particular and all the characters have been given their due time on screen to reflect their true essence."

Accolades

References

External links 
 

2017 Pakistani television series debuts
2018 Pakistani television series endings
ARY Digital original programming
Pakistani drama television series
Urdu-language television shows
Pakistani television series endings